Manswers (spelt onscreen as MANswers: Faster & Harder  in season three, and MANswers: Shock & Awe in season four) is an American late night comedy series that premiered on Spike on September 19, 2007.

The series is produced by reality television production company, SuperDelicious, and aired on Spike. The executive producers are Adam Cohen, Cara Tapper, Joanna Vernetti, Akifumi Takuma, and Michael Schelp. It garnered an average of 1.1 million viewers during its first year among a specific target audience.

The first season consisted of 9 half-hour episodes. The second season showed 13 episodes of similar material.

MANswers, a portmanteau of man + answers, is a satire aimed at predominantly male audiences, primarily aged 18–40. Questions of a comical nature are asked and answered which usually relate to women and dating tips, sex-related questions and trivia, defense mechanisms in harmful situations, and firearms. Specialists with Masters and PhD degrees are brought in and give information.

Overview
MANswers has a magazine style format which discusses hypothetical questions believed to be the type men discuss. It has a narrator who talks about the topics, usually over a reenactment, with footage of women dancing, beer being poured, or nun-chucks. The narrator shouts MANSWERS and an explosion happens.

Cast
Bobbi Billard (Hot Teacher / Lingerie Model / Poker Girl in Opening Credits) (31 episodes, 2007–2010)
Matt Short (Narrator / Voice) (29 episodes, 2007–2010) 
Ward Roberts  (20 episodes, 2008–2010) 
Heidi Shepherd (Various roles) (20 episodes, 2008–2010) 
Eric Martic (Nightclub patron) (19 episodes, 2007–2008) 
Destiny Monique (Model) (13 episodes, 2008–2010)
Luke Barnett (Stoner Joe) (3 episodes, 2007)
Miki Black (Cop / Various Characters) (7 episodes, 2007)
Nadia Dawn (Lisa Loveland) (13 episodes, 2007)
Bobby DiPasquale (Boyfriend) (1 episode, 2007)
Kimberly Evan (Swedish Woman) (1 episode, 2007)
Garrett Forbes (Hero Guy #2) (1 episode, 2007)
Stacey Hayes (Nagging Girl / Massage Therapist / Watermelon's / Beach Babe / Hot Blonde Girl / Pretty Woman / Hottie on Treadmill) (7 episodes, 2007-2008)
Jacqueline Hickel (Girlfriend) (1 episode, 2007)
Britten Kelley (Hot Beach Bunny) (1 episode, 2007)
Lamont King (Himself) (1 episode, 2007)
Lance Kramer (Poker King & Beer Chugger) (3 episodes, 2007)
Jay Laisne (Organ Doctor / South African) (1 episode, 2007)
Eric Martic (Nightclub Patron) (19 episodes, 2007-2008)
Mike Nielsen (Kung Fu Nerd) (9 episodes, 2007)
Carl Peterson (Car Highjacker / Patient) (2 episodes, 2007)
Rob Polonsky (Himself) (3 episodes, 2007)
Flood Reed (Organ Donor / Redneck / Carjacker) (3 episodes, 2007)
Bobby Rice (Couch Friend) (1 episode, 2007)
Zander Schaus (Kidney Donor / Date Guy / Car Jacked / Bar Buddy) (4 episodes, 2007)
Michael Strynkowski (Roommate) (1 episode, 2007)
Monier West (Moneer Yaqubi) (9 episodes, 2007)
Riley Steele (1 episode, 2010)
Kaye Marie Talise

Reception
Comedian Eric Andre said about the show "If Maxim Magazine and crystal meth had a baby, it would give anal birth to the show Manswers". He also says that the show is just about boobs and farts.

References

External links

A review of MANswers by infoMania
Confessions of a MANswers addict by April MacIntyre MonstersandCritics.com

2007 American television series debuts
2011 American television series endings
Spike (TV network) original programming
2000s American late-night television series
2010s American late-night television series
English-language television shows